Frederick Edwin Bullock (1 July 1886 – 14 November 1922) was an English professional footballer, best remembered for his 11-year spell with Huddersfield Town, before, during and after the First World War. He played left back and captained the club.

International career 
Bullock won one cap for England, which came in a 2–0 win over Ireland in 1920. He won an amateur cap in 1910.

Personal life 
Bullock was married to Maude and had one son. He served as a lance corporal in the Football Battalion during the First World War and was wounded in the right shoulder during the Battle of the Somme in 1916, in the region of Delville Wood and Guillemont. He was injured in the left knee after an accident in 1918 and was demobilised in March 1920. After his retirement from football in 1922, Bullock became landlord of the Slubber's Arms pub in Huddersfield. He died of heart failure due to ammonia poisoning in November 1922 and had been suffering "nerve troubles" during the month preceding his death.

Honours 
Huddersfield Town
 Football League Second Division second-place promotion: 1919–20
Brentford
 London Combination: 1918–19

Career statistics

References

1886 births
1922 deaths
Footballers from Hounslow
Association football fullbacks
English footballers
England international footballers
Hounslow F.C. players
Custom House F.C. players
Ilford F.C. players
Huddersfield Town A.F.C. players
English Football League players
Brentford F.C. wartime guest players
England amateur international footballers
British Army personnel of World War I
People from Whitton, London
Middlesex Regiment soldiers
British landlords
FA Cup Final players
Deaths by ammonia poisoning